Sweet Forgiveness is the sixth album by Bonnie Raitt, released in 1977. The single "Two Lives" was provided by the leader of bassist Freebo's former band Edison Electric Band songwriter Mark T. Jordan.

Raitt's cover of the Del Shannon hit "Runaway" was issued as a single, reaching #57 on the U.S. singles chart.

Track listing
"About to Make Me Leave Home" (Earl Randall) – 4:14
"Runaway" (Max Crook, Del Shannon) – 3:57
"Two Lives" (Mark Jordan) – 3:49
"Louise" (Paul Siebel) – 2:45
"Gamblin' Man" (Eric Kaz) – 3:27
"Sweet Forgiveness" (Daniel Moore) – 4:11
"My Opening Farewell" (Jackson Browne) – 5:20
"Three Time Loser" (Don Covay, Ron Miller) – 3:19
"Takin' My Time" (Bill Payne) – 3:37
"Home" (Karla Bonoff) – 3:28

Personnel
Bonnie Raitt – acoustic guitar, guitar, electric guitar, vocals, slide guitar
Norton Buffalo – harmonica
Rosemary Butler – vocals
Lester Chambers – vocals
Sam Clayton – conductor, conga
Freebo – bass, guitar, vocals, fretless bass
David Grisman – mandolin, mandocello
Jef Labes – keyboard
Maxayn Lewis – vocals
Michael McDonald – vocals
Will McFarlane – guitar, electric guitar, slide guitar
Bill Payne – organ, synthesizer, piano, keyboard, vocals, Fender Rhodes
J.D. Souther – vocals
Fred Tackett – acoustic guitar, guitar, keyboard
Dennis Whitted – drums
Carlena Williams – vocals

Production
Producer: Paul A. Rothchild
Engineers: John Haeny, Roger Mayer
Remastering: Keith Blake, Lee Herschberg
Series producer: Gregg Geller
Project coordinator: Jo Motta
Art direction: John Van Hamersveld
Photography: John Van Hamersveld

Charts
Album - Billboard (United States)

Singles - Billboard (United States)

References

Bonnie Raitt albums
1977 albums
Albums produced by Paul A. Rothchild
Warner Records albums
Albums recorded at Sunset Sound Recorders